Imipramine, sold under the brand name Tofranil, among others, is a tricyclic antidepressant (TCA) mainly used in the treatment of depression. It is also effective in treating anxiety and panic disorder. Imipramine may also be used off-label for nocturnal enuresis and chronic pain. Imipramine is taken by mouth.

Common side effects of imipramine include dry mouth, drowsiness, dizziness, low blood pressure, rapid heart rate, urinary retention, and electrocardiogram changes. Overdose of the medication can result in death. Imipramine appears to work by increasing levels of serotonin and norepinephrine and by blocking certain serotonin, adrenergic, histamine, and cholinergic receptors.

Imipramine was discovered in 1951 and was introduced for medical use in 1957. It was the first TCA to be marketed. Imipramine and the other TCAs have decreased in use in recent decades, due to the introduction of the selective serotonin reuptake inhibitors (SSRIs), which have fewer side effects and are far safer in overdose.

Medical uses
Imipramine is used in the treatment of depression and certain anxiety disorders. It is similar in efficacy to the antidepressant drug moclobemide. It has also been used to treat nocturnal enuresis because of its ability to shorten the time of delta wave stage sleep, where wetting occurs. In veterinary medicine, imipramine is used with xylazine to induce pharmacologic ejaculation in stallions. Blood levels between 150 and 250 ng/mL of imipramine plus its metabolite desipramine generally correspond to antidepressant efficacy.

Available forms 
Imipramine is available in the form of oral tablets and capsules.

Contraindications
Combining it with alcohol consumption causes excessive drowsiness. It may be unsafe during pregnancy.

Side effects
These side effects can be contributed to the multiple receptors that imipramine targets such as serotonin, norepinephrine, dopamine, acetylcholine, epinephrine, histamine. Those listed in italics below denote common side effects, separated by the organ systems that are affected.
 Central nervous system: dizziness, drowsiness, confusion, seizures, headache, anxiety, tremors, stimulation, weakness, insomnia, nightmares, extrapyramidal symptoms in geriatric patients, increased psychiatric symptoms, paresthesia
 Cardiovascular: orthostatic hypotension, ECG changes, tachycardia, hypertension, palpitations, dysrhythmias
 Eyes, ears, nose and throat: blurred vision, tinnitus, mydriasis
 Gastrointestinal: dry mouth, nausea, vomiting, paralytic ileus, increased appetite, cramps, epigastric distress, jaundice, hepatitis, stomatitis, constipation, taste change
 Genitourinary: urinary retention
 Hematological: agranulocytosis, thrombocytopenia, eosinophilia, leukopenia
 Skin: rash, urticaria, diaphoresis, pruritus, photosensitivity

Overdose

Interactions

Pharmacology

Pharmacodynamics

Imipramine affects numerous neurotransmitter systems known to be involved in the etiology of depression, anxiety, attention-deficit hyperactivity disorder (ADHD), enuresis and numerous other mental and physical conditions. Imipramine is similar in structure to some muscle relaxants, and has a significant analgesic effect and, thus, is very useful in some pain conditions.

The mechanisms of imipramine's actions include, but are not limited to, effects on:

 Serotonin: very strong reuptake inhibition. Imipramine is a tertiary TCA, and is a potent inhibitor of serotonin reuptake, and to a greater extent than secondary amine TCAs such as nortriptyline and despiramine. 
 Norepinephrine: strong reuptake inhibition. Desipramine has more affinity to norepinephrine transporter than imipramine.
 Dopamine: imipramine blocks D2 receptors. Imipramine, and its metabolite desipramine, have no appreciable affinity for the dopamine transporter (Ki = 8,500 and >10,000 nM, respectively). 
 Acetylcholine: imipramine is an anticholinergic, specifically an antagonist of the muscarinic acetylcholine receptors. Thus, it is prescribed with caution to the elderly and with extreme caution to those with psychosis, as the general brain activity enhancement in combination with the "dementing" effects of anticholinergics increases the potential of imipramine to cause hallucinations, confusion and delirium in this population.
 Epinephrine: imipramine antagonizes adrenergic receptors, thus sometimes causing orthostatic hypotension.
 Sigma receptor: activity on sigma receptors is present, but it is very weak (Ki = 520 nM) and it is about half that of amitriptyline (Ki = 300 nM).
 Histamine: imipramine is an antagonist of the histamine H1 receptors.
 BDNF: BDNF is implicated in neurogenesis in the hippocampus, and studies suggest that depressed patients have decreased levels of BDNF and reduced hippocampal neurogenesis. It is not clear how neurogenesis restores mood, as ablation of hippocampal neurogenesis in murine models do not show anxiety related or depression related behaviours. Chronic imipramine administration results in increased histone acetylation (which is associated with transcriptional activation and decondensed chromatin) at the hippocampal BDNF promoter, and also reduced expression of hippocampal HDAC5.

Pharmacokinetics
Within the body, imipramine is converted into desipramine (desmethylimipramine) as a metabolite.

Chemistry
Imipramine is a tricyclic compound, specifically a dibenzazepine, and possesses three rings fused together with a side chain attached in its chemical structure. Other dibenzazepine TCAs include desipramine (N-desmethylimipramine), clomipramine (3-chloroimipramine), trimipramine (2′-methylimipramine or β-methylimipramine), and lofepramine (N-(4-chlorobenzoylmethyl)desipramine). Imipramine is a tertiary amine TCA, with its side chain-demethylated metabolite desipramine being a secondary amine. Other tertiary amine TCAs include amitriptyline, clomipramine, dosulepin (dothiepin), doxepin, and trimipramine. The chemical name of imipramine is 3-(10,11-dihydro-5H-dibenzo[b,f]azepin-5-yl)-N,N-dimethylpropan-1-amine and its free base form has a chemical formula of C19H24N2 with a molecular weight of 280.407 g/mol. The drug is used commercially mostly as the hydrochloride salt; the embonate (pamoate) salt is used for intramuscular administration and the free base form is not used. The CAS Registry Number of the free base is 50-49-7, of the hydrochloride is 113-52-0, and of the embonate is 10075-24-8.

History
The parent compound of imipramine, 10,11-dihydro-5H-dibenz[b,f]azepine (dibenzazepine), was first synthesized in 1899, but no pharmacological assessment of this compound or any substituted derivatives was undertaken until the late 1940s. Imipramine was first synthesized in 1951, as an antihistamine. The antipsychotic effects of chlorpromazine were discovered in 1952, and imipramine was then developed and studied as an antipsychotic for use in patients with schizophrenia. The medication was tested in several hundred patients with psychosis, but showed little effectiveness. However, imipramine was serendipitously found to possess antidepressant effects in the mid-1950s following a case report of symptom improvement in a woman with severe depression who had been treated with it. This was followed by similar observations in other patients and further clinical research. Subsequently, imipramine was introduced for the treatment of depression in Europe in 1958 and in the United States in 1959. Along with the discovery and introduction of the monoamine oxidase inhibitor iproniazid as an antidepressant around the same time, imipramine resulted in the establishment of monoaminergic drugs as antidepressants.

In the late 1950s, imipramine was the first TCA to be developed (by Ciba). At the first international congress of neuropharmacology in Rome, September 1958 Dr Freyhan from the University of Pennsylvania discussed as one of the first clinicians the effects of imipramine in a group of 46 patients, most of them diagnosed as "depressive psychosis". The patients were selected for this study based on symptoms such as depressive apathy, kinetic retardation and feelings of hopelessness and despair. In 30% of all patients, he reported optimal results, and in around 20%, failure. The side effects noted were atropine-like, and most patients experienced dizziness. Imipramine was first tried for treating psychotic disorders such as schizophrenia, but proved ineffective. As an antidepressant, it did well in clinical studies and it is known to work well in even the most severe cases of depression. It is not surprising, therefore, that imipramine may cause a high rate of manic and hypomanic reactions in hospitalized patients with pre-existing bipolar disorder, with one study showing that up to 25% of such patients maintained on Imipramine switched into mania or hypomania. Such powerful antidepressant properties have made it favorable in the treatment of treatment-resistant depression.

Before the advent of selective serotonin reuptake inhibitors (SSRIs), its sometimes intolerable side-effect profile was considered more tolerable. Therefore, it became extensively used as a standard antidepressant and later served as a prototypical drug for the development of the later-released TCAs. Since the 1990s, it has no longer been used as commonly, but is sometimes still prescribed as a second-line treatment for treating major depression . It has also seen limited use in the treatment of migraines, ADHD, and post-concussive syndrome. Imipramine has additional indications for the treatment of panic attacks, chronic pain, and Kleine-Levin syndrome. In pediatric patients, it is relatively frequently used to treat pavor nocturnus and nocturnal enuresis.

Society and culture

Generic names
Its generic name in Spanish and Italian and its  are imipramina, in German is imipramin, and in Latin is imipraminum. The embonate salt is known as imipramine pamoate.

Brand names
Imipramine is marketed throughout the world mainly under the brand name Tofranil. Imipramine pamoate is marketed under the brand name Tofranil-PM for intramuscular injection.

Availability
Imipramine is available for medical use widely throughout the world, including in the United States, the United Kingdom, elsewhere in Europe, India, Brazil, South Africa, Australia, and New Zealand.

Prescription trends 
Between 1998 and 2017, along with amitriptyline, imipramine was the most commonly prescribed first antidepressant for children aged 5-11 years in England.

References

Further reading

External links
 
 

Alpha-1 blockers
CYP2D6 inhibitors
D2 antagonists
Dibenzazepines
Dimethylamino compounds
Glycine receptor antagonists
H1 receptor antagonists
Muscarinic antagonists
Nicotinic antagonists
Novartis brands
Serotonin receptor antagonists
Serotonin–norepinephrine reuptake inhibitors
Tricyclic antidepressants